The Imperial Crown of Mexico was the crown created for the Sovereign of Mexico on two separate occasions in the 19th century. The first was created upon the Declaration of Independence of the Mexican Empire from the kingdom of Spain in 1821, for the First Mexican Empire. The second crown was created upon the decree of the Assembly of Notables in 1863 for the Second Mexican Empire.

First Mexican Empire
The crown of the First Mexican Empire was made for Emperor Agustín I in 1822, and it can be seen in many of his portraits. However, its history is not entirely known.

Second Mexican Empire
The second Imperial Crown of Mexico, created during the Second Mexican Empire for Emperor Maximilian I (his consort was Charlotte of Belgium, known as Empress Carlota), who reigned from 1864 to 1867, is better documented. The original crown was destroyed during the ensuing fighting and victory of the Mexican republic, but replicas remain on display.

The Imperial Crown of Mexico during Maximilian's reign was modeled on the crowns of France and Austria. The crown of Maximilian's ancestor, Maximilian I, Holy Roman Emperor, had two arches which crossed over the top of the miter. It is this unique form which appears to have been the model.

However, since Napoleon III was the main power behind the Second Mexican Empire, and as an extension of the Second French Empire, the Mexican crown also used the half-arches and eagles on the circlet on the front, back and sides from the crown of Napoleon III. The Imperial Crown of Mexico also shares many similarities with the Crown of Empress Eugenie, Napoleon III's consort.

References

External links 
 https://web.archive.org/web/20050305022633/http://www.casaimperial.org/
 C.M. Mayo's blog for researchers of Mexico's Second Empire, a period also known as the French Intervention
 Library of Congress lecture (podcast) by C.M. Mayo about research in the Emperor Iturbide and Iturbide Family archives, July 2009

Mexico
History of Mexico
Mexican monarchy
National symbols of Mexico